1999 Broadway is a 46-story high-rise office building in the city of Denver, Colorado. The building was designed by Curtis W. Fentress, FAIA, RIBA of Fentress Architects and its construction was completed in 1985. It stands at a height of 548 ft (166m), making it the 6th tallest building in Denver. 1999 Broadway has a unique shape, it is shaped like a triangle with a scoop in the side. This is caused by the desire to retain the historical Holy Ghost Catholic Church at the base.

See also
List of tallest buildings in Denver

References

Emporis
Skyscraperpage

Skyscraper office buildings in Denver
Office buildings completed in 1985